Bettina Schmidt (2 June 1960 – 28 April 2019) was an East German luger who competed during the mid-1980s. She was born in Staßfurt, Saxony-Anhalt. She won the silver medal in the women's singles event at the 1984 Winter Olympics in Sarajevo. Schmidt also won a gold medal in the women's singles event at the 1982 FIL European Luge Championships in Winterberg, West Germany. She tied for the overall Luge World Cup championship in women's singles in 1983–4 with fellow East German Steffi Martin.

References

Kluge, Volker. (2000). Das große Lexikon der DDR-Sportler. Berlin: Schwarzkopf & Schwarzkopf. 
 

Bettina Schmidt's obituary

External links

1960 births
2019 deaths
People from Staßfurt
German female lugers
Lugers at the 1984 Winter Olympics
Olympic silver medalists for East Germany
Olympic lugers of East Germany
Olympic medalists in luge
National People's Army military athletes
Medalists at the 1984 Winter Olympics
20th-century German women
Sportspeople from Saxony-Anhalt